US Post Office-Flushing Main is a historic post office building located at Flushing in Queens County, New York, United States. It was designed and built between 1932 and 1934 by architect Dwight James Baum and William W. Knowles as consulting architects to the Office of the Supervising Architect. It is a symmetrically massed, two-story steel frame building clad in oversize handmade red brick with marble trim in the Colonial Revival style. Its main facade features an entrance portico consisting of six Ionic columns that support a full pedimented entablature. The interior features a mural executed in 1933-34 by Vincent Aderente.

It was listed on the National Register of Historic Places in 1988.

References
  

Flushing Main
Government buildings completed in 1934
Colonial Revival architecture in New York City
Government buildings in Queens, New York
Flushing, Queens
National Register of Historic Places in Queens, New York
1934 establishments in New York City